The 51st Infantry Division (51-ya Pekhotnaya Diviziya) was an infantry formation of the Russian Imperial Army.

Organization
1st Brigade
201st Infantry Regiment
202nd Infantry Regiment
2nd Brigade
203rd Infantry Regiment
204th Infantry Regiment
51st Artillery Brigade

References

Infantry divisions of the Russian Empire
Military units and formations disestablished in 1918